St. Mochta's House is a medieval oratory and National Monument in County Louth, Ireland.

Location

St. Mochta's House is located to the northwest of Louth village.

History

Mochta (d. AD 535/543) was a disciple of Saint Patrick and established a monastery at Louth village c. 528. There are no physical remains from the early monastery. The ruined buildings at the site today are the 13th century church of St. Mary's Priory, Louth and the oratory called St Mochta's House, which is believed to date from the second half of the twelfth century, although some sources place it earlier, in the 9th–11th centuries.

There are many stone buildings in Ireland with the names of saints' houses, such as St. Columb's House, Kells, County Meath. Most of these buildings are said to contain the grave or relics of the titular saint. In the year 1242, according to the Annals of Connacht, "The Archbishop of Armagh and the canons abbots of Ireland held a great chapter to honour the Order in Louth when some of the relics which Mochta had assembled from Rome were raised." This suggests that Mochta brought back relics of other saints from Rome, but it's also possible that his own bones were added to them.

The surrounding wall was built in 1906 by Louth County Council, and conservation work was done in 1934 by the Office of Public Works.

Building

St. Mochta's House is a rectangular building with barrel-vaulted roof, and a chamber above reachable by an internal stair.

References

Religion in County Louth
Archaeological sites in County Louth
National Monuments in County Louth
Former churches in the Republic of Ireland